This is a list of supermarket chains in Bahrain.

Midway, Carrefour, Lulu Hypermarket, and Mega Mart are a few of the largest supermarket chains currently operating in the country.

Current supermarket chains
 MegaMart Supermarket
Almuntazah Supermarket
 Al Jazira Supermarket
 Alosra Supermarket
 Carrefour
 Jawad Supermarket
 LastChance
 Le Marché Hypermarket
 LuLu Hypermarket
 Midway Supermarket
 MasterPoint Supermarket
 Nesto Hypermarket
 AlHelli Supermarket
Al Adil Supermarket
 Magandang Buhay Atin Ito Supermarket- the only Filipino owned supermarket in the Kingdom of Bahrain

External links
 Carrefour Bahrain | in English
 Le Marché website

References

Bahrain
Supermarkets of Bahrain
Supermarket chains